Abū al-Maʿālī Sayf al-Dīn Saʿīd b. al-Muṭahhar b. Saʿīd Bākharzī (al-Bākharzī,  (1190–1261)  shortened as Sayf al-Dīn Bākharzī, was a poet, sheikh, and theologian who lived in the 13th century. As suggested by his nisba, he was born and raised in Bakharz, a district of the province of Quhistan in Khorasan, and he got religious education in Herat and Nishapur cities. When he achieved unusual successes in mystical teaching, he moved to Khorezm. There he became one of nearest followers of very popular sheikh – Nadjm ed-Din Kubra. Afterwards, according to the prominent poet Abdurahman Djami Boharsi (15th century), Sheikh Saif ed-Din went to Bukhara as a tutor. In Bukhara he was honored with the title of "Sheikh al-Alam" ("sheikh of peace").

Unlike his teacher, Sayf al-Din Bakharzi safely survived the Mongol invasion. He lived in Bukhara about 40 years under new rulers. Moreover, he had incontestable authority over ruling elite. For example, Berke Khan, who was brother of Batu Khan, once had visited sheikh al-Boharsi. Because of this meeting, the powerful Khan of the Kipchak or Golden Horde had adopted Islam.

The mausoleum dedicated to him and Bayan-Quli Khan was built in the settlement called Fathabad, to the east from medieval Bukhara.

See also
Saif ed-Din Bokharzi & Bayan-Quli Khan Mausoleums
Mir Sayyid Ali Hamadani

References

Further reading
 

Hanafis
Maturidis
1261 deaths
13th-century Iranian people
Poets of the medieval Islamic world
13th-century poets
Sufism
People from Razavi Khorasan Province
1190 births